First Woman's Bank of Tennessee was founded by Brenda Vineyard Runyon in Clarksville, Tennessee, in 1919. The bank was the first bank in the United States to be managed and directed entirely by women. Runyon resigned her position in 1926 due to failing health and was unable to secure a successor. The First Trust and Savings Bank of Clarksville absorbed the bank in 1926.

References

Bibliography
  First Woman's Bank in Tennessee: 1919-1926. H. Bruce Throckmorton and H. Bruce Throckman. Tennessee Historical Quarterly, Vol. 35, No. 4 (Winter 1976), pp. 389–392

Defunct banks of the United States
Banks disestablished in 1926
Banks established in 1919
Women's organizations based in the United States
History of women in Tennessee
Clarksville, Tennessee
1919 establishments in Tennessee
1926 disestablishments in Tennessee